Lewis Saul Benjamin (pen name, Lewis Melville; 1874–1932) was an English author, born into a Jewish family in London, England and educated privately in England and Germany.  From 1896 to 1901 he was known as an actor, though part of his time even then was devoted to literature.  
His publications include:  
 In the World of Mimes: A Theatrical Novel (1902)  
 The Thackeray Country (1905)  
 Victorian Novelists (1906)  
 Bath under Beau Nash (1907)  
 The Beau of the Regency (1908)  
 William Makepeace Thackeray: A Biography (1909)  
 The Life and Letters of Laurence Sterne (two volumes, 1911; American edition, 1912)  
 The Life and Letters of William Cobbett (two volumes, 1912; American edition, 1913)  
 An edition of Thackeray's works (twenty volumes, 1901–07)

References

External links 
 
 
 

English Jewish writers
English book editors
20th-century English novelists
English biographers
English non-fiction writers
English male stage actors
1874 births
1932 deaths
English male novelists
20th-century English male writers
English male non-fiction writers
Male biographers
20th-century biographers
Writers from London
19th-century English male actors
20th-century English male actors